Effusion is the process of gases passing through a small hole.

Effusion may also refer to:

Medicine
The seeping of fluid into a body cavity, the fluid itself, or an abnormal collection of fluid in a body cavity or space:
Ascites
Pericardial effusion
Pleural effusion
Joint effusion
Subdural Effusion
Mastoid Effusion
Knee effusion
Sometimes called "hydrops"

Geology
Effusive eruption, an effusion of lava from a volcano